The 2000 Villanova Wildcats football team represented the Villanova University during the 2000 NCAA Division I-AA football season. The Wildcats were led by 16th-year head coach Andy Talley played their home games at Villanova Stadium in Villanova, Pennsylvania

Schedule

Roster

References

Villanova
Villanova Wildcats football seasons
Villanova Wildcats football